Guijo de Granadilla is a municipality located in the province of Cáceres, Extremadura, Spain. It is located at 32 kilometers from Plasencia.

References 

Municipalities in the Province of Cáceres